Rafina-Pikermi is a municipality in the East Attica regional unit, Attica, Greece. The seat of the municipality is the town Rafina. The municipality has an area of 40.501 km2.

Municipality
The municipality Rafina-Pikermi was formed at the 2011 local government reform by the merger of the following 2 former municipalities, that became municipal units:
Pikermi
Rafina

References

Municipalities of Attica
Populated places in East Attica